Vestli is a subway station on Grorud Line of the Oslo Metro. It is the last station on the line and comes after Stovner. The station is located in the Stovner borough. The station opened 21 December 1975. The station has a small depot for subway carriages beyond the platforms.

The area around Vestli, the northernmost neighborhood of Stovner, is residential. Like the station at Stovner, Vestli is located beneath some shops, though not as large as the shopping centre at Stovner.

References

External links

Oslo Metro stations in Oslo
Railway stations opened in 1975
1975 establishments in Norway